Rosa María Rodríguez Magda is a Spanish philosopher and writer. In 1989, she introduced the concept of transmodernity.

References

Spanish philosophers
Living people
1957 births
21st-century Spanish philosophers
20th-century Spanish philosophers
Spanish feminists
People from Valencia